The 1956 Tipperary Senior Hurling Championship was the 66th staging of the Tipperary Senior Hurling Championship since its establishment by the Tipperary County Board in 1887.

Thurles Sarsfields were the defending champions.

On 30 September 1956, Thurles Sarsfields won the championship after a 3-08 to 1-04 defeat of Lorrha in the final at Thurles Sportsfield. It was their 19th championship title overall and their second title in succession.

Results

Final

References

Tipperary
Tipperary Senior Hurling Championship